This is a list of 266 species in the genus Hydropsyche.

Hydropsyche species

 Hydropsyche abyssinica Kimmins, 1963
 Hydropsyche acinoxas Malicky, 1981
 Hydropsyche acuta Martynov, 1909
 Hydropsyche adrastos Malicky & Chantaramongkol, 1996
 Hydropsyche adspersa Navás, 1932
 Hydropsyche aerata Ross, 1938
 Hydropsyche afghanistanica Schmid, 1963
 Hydropsyche aiakos Malicky, 1997
 Hydropsyche alabama Lago & Harris, 1991
 Hydropsyche alaca Malicky, 1974
 Hydropsyche alanya Sipahiler, 1987
 Hydropsyche alhedra (Ross, 1939)
 Hydropsyche alternans (Walker, 1852)
 Hydropsyche alvata Denning, 1949
 Hydropsyche ambigua Schmid, 1973
 Hydropsyche ambonensis Mey, 1998
 Hydropsyche anachoreta Mey & Jung, 1986
 Hydropsyche ancorapunctata Tanida, 1986
 Hydropsyche angustipennis (Curtis, 1834)
 Hydropsyche annulata (Ulmer, 1905)
 Hydropsyche appendicularis Martynov, 1931
 Hydropsyche arinale Ross, 1938
 Hydropsyche asiatica Ulmer, 1905
 Hydropsyche auricolor Ulmer, 1905
 Hydropsyche bacanensis Mey, 1998
 Hydropsyche banksi Kimmins, 1955
 Hydropsyche bassi Flint, Voshell & Parker, 1979
 Hydropsyche batavorum Botosaneanu, 1979
 Hydropsyche betteni Ross, 1938
 Hydropsyche bidens Ross, 1938
 Hydropsyche bidentata Denning, 1948
 Hydropsyche binaria Mey, 1996
 Hydropsyche bitlis Malicky, 1986
 Hydropsyche borealis Martynov, 1926
 Hydropsyche botosaneanui Marinkovic-Gospodnetic, 1966
 Hydropsyche breviculata Kobayashi, 1987
 Hydropsyche brevis Mosely, 1930
 Hydropsyche bronta Ross, 1938
 Hydropsyche brunneipennis Flint & Butler, 1983
 Hydropsyche bryanti Banks, 1939
 Hydropsyche buenafei Mey, 1998
 Hydropsyche buergersi Ulmer, 1915
 Hydropsyche bujnurdica Botosaneanu, 1998
 Hydropsyche bulbifera McLachlan, 1878
 Hydropsyche bulgaromanorum Malicky, 1977
 Hydropsyche buyssoni Ulmer, 1907
 Hydropsyche bwambana Mosely, 1939
 Hydropsyche californica Banks, 1899
 Hydropsyche carolina Banks, 1938
 Hydropsyche catawba Ross, 1939
 Hydropsyche cebuensis Mey, 1998
 Hydropsyche celebensis Ulmer, 1951
 Hydropsyche cetibeli Malicky & Sipahiler, 1993
 Hydropsyche claviformis Mey, 1996
 Hydropsyche complicata Banks, 1939
 Hydropsyche confusa (Walker, 1852)
 Hydropsyche consanguinea McLachlan, 1884
 Hydropsyche contubernalis McLachlan, 1865
 Hydropsyche cornuta Martynov, 1909
 Hydropsyche cuanis Ross, 1938
 Hydropsyche cyrnotica Botosaneanu & Giudicelli, 1981
 Hydropsyche davisi Mey, 1998
 Hydropsyche debirasi Malicky, 1974
 Hydropsyche decalda Ross, 1947
 Hydropsyche decora Navás, 1932
 Hydropsyche delrio Ross, 1941
 Hydropsyche demavenda Malicky, 1977
 Hydropsyche demora Ross, 1941
 Hydropsyche depravata Hagen, 1861
 Hydropsyche dhusaravarna Schmid, 1975
 Hydropsyche dicantha Ross, 1938
 Hydropsyche didyma Mey, 1999
 Hydropsyche difficultata Kobayashi, 1984
 Hydropsyche dilatata Tanida, 1986
 Hydropsyche dinarica Marinkovic-Gospodnetic, 1979
 Hydropsyche discreta Tjeder, 1952
 Hydropsyche djabai Schmid, 1959
 Hydropsyche doctersi Ulmer, 1951
 Hydropsyche doehleri Tobias, 1972
 Hydropsyche dubia Schmid, 1952
 Hydropsyche effusa Mey, 1996
 Hydropsyche elissoma Ross, 1947
 Hydropsyche emarginata Navas, 1923
 Hydropsyche erythrophthalma McLachlan, 1875
 Hydropsyche exocellata Dufour, 1841
 Hydropsyche fasciolata Navás, 1926
 Hydropsyche fattigi Ross, 1941
 Hydropsyche fezana Navás, 1932
 Hydropsyche fischeri Botosaneanu, 1980
 Hydropsyche flynni Korboot, 1964
 Hydropsyche formosae Iwata, 1928
 Hydropsyche formosana Ulmer, 1911
 Hydropsyche franclemonti Flint, 1992
 Hydropsyche frisoni Ross, 1938
 Hydropsyche fryeri Ulmer, 1915
 Hydropsyche fulvipes (Curtis, 1834)
 Hydropsyche fumata Tobias, 1972
 Hydropsyche furcula Tian & Li, 1985
 Hydropsyche gemecika Malicky, 1981
 Hydropsyche gemellata Mey, 1998
 Hydropsyche gereckei Moretti, 1991
 Hydropsyche gerostizai Mey, 1998
 Hydropsyche gifuana Ulmer, 1907
 Hydropsyche grahami Banks, 1940
 Hydropsyche guttata Pictet, 1834
 Hydropsyche hackeri Mey, 1998
 Hydropsyche hageni Banks, 1905
 Hydropsyche hamifera Ulmer, 1905
 Hydropsyche harpagofalcata Mey, 1995
 Hydropsyche hedini Forsslund, 1935
 Hydropsyche hobbyi Mosely, 1951
 Hydropsyche hoenei Schmid, 1959
 Hydropsyche hoffmani Ross, 1962
 Hydropsyche hreblayi Mey, 1998
 Hydropsyche iberomaroccana Gonzalez & Malicky, 1999
 Hydropsyche impula Denning, 1948
 Hydropsyche incognita Pitsch, 1993
 Hydropsyche incommoda Hagen, 1861
 Hydropsyche indica Betten, 1909
 Hydropsyche infernalis Schmid, 1952
 Hydropsyche initiana Mey, 1998
 Hydropsyche injusta Banks, 1938
 Hydropsyche instabilis (Curtis, 1834)
 Hydropsyche iokaste Malicky, 1999
 Hydropsyche irroratella Ulmer, 1951
 Hydropsyche isolata Banks, 1931
 Hydropsyche janstockiana Botosaneanu, 1979
 Hydropsyche javanica Ulmer, 1905
 Hydropsyche jeanneli Mosely, 1939
 Hydropsyche jordanensis Tjeder, 1946
 Hydropsyche kagiana Kobayashi, 1987
 Hydropsyche kalliesi Mey, 1999
 Hydropsyche katugahakanda Schmid, 1958
 Hydropsyche kawamurai Tsuda, 1940
 Hydropsyche kebab Malicky, 1974
 Hydropsyche kinzelbachi Malicky, 1980
 Hydropsyche kirikhan Sipahiler, 1998
 Hydropsyche klefbecki Tjeder, 1946
 Hydropsyche kreuzbergorum Mey & Jung, 1989
 Hydropsyche lagranja Botosaneanu, 1999
 Hydropsyche leonardi Ross, 1938
 Hydropsyche lepnevae Botosaneanu, 1968
 Hydropsyche leptocerina Navas, 1917
 Hydropsyche lobata McLachlan, 1884
 Hydropsyche lobulata Martynov, 1936
 Hydropsyche longifurca Kimmins, 1957
 Hydropsyche longindex Botosaneanu & Moubayed, 1985
 Hydropsyche longipalpis Banks, 1920
 Hydropsyche maderensis Hagen, 1865
 Hydropsyche mahrkusha Schmid, 1959
 Hydropsyche malassanka Schmid, 1958
 Hydropsyche malickyi Mey, 1998
 Hydropsyche maniemensis Marlier, 1961
 Hydropsyche marceus Scudder, 1890
 Hydropsyche maroccana Navás, 1936
 Hydropsyche marqueti Navas, 1907
 Hydropsyche martynovi Botosaneanu, 1968
 Hydropsyche maura Navás, 1932
 Hydropsyche mississippiensis Flint, 1972
 Hydropsyche modesta Navás, 1925
 Hydropsyche mokaensis Jacquemart, 1960
 Hydropsyche morettii De Pietro, 1996
 Hydropsyche morla Malicky & Lounaci, 1987
 Hydropsyche morosa Hagen, 1861
 Hydropsyche mostarensis Klapalek, 1898
 Hydropsyche namwa Mosely, 1939
 Hydropsyche napaea Mey, 1996
 Hydropsyche nasuta Ulmer, 1930
 Hydropsyche naumanni Mey, 1998
 Hydropsyche negrosensis Mey, 1998
 Hydropsyche nervosa Klapalek, 1899
 Hydropsyche nuristanica Schmid, 1963
 Hydropsyche obscura Navás, 1928
 Hydropsyche occidentalis Banks, 1900
 Hydropsyche operta (Scudder, 1877)
 Hydropsyche opthalmica Flint, 1965
 Hydropsyche orbiculata Ulmer, 1911
 Hydropsyche orduensis Sipahiler, 1987
 Hydropsyche orectis Mey, 1999
 Hydropsyche ornatula McLachlan, 1878
 Hydropsyche orris Ross, 1938
 Hydropsyche oslari (Banks, 1905)
 Hydropsyche palawanensis Mey, 1998
 Hydropsyche pallidipennis Martynov, 1935
 Hydropsyche pallipennis Banks, 1938
 Hydropsyche palpalis Navás, 1936
 Hydropsyche patera Schuster & Etnier, 1978
 Hydropsyche pellucidula (Curtis, 1834)
 Hydropsyche perelin Malicky, 1987
 Hydropsyche peristerica Botosaneanu & Marinkovic-Gospodnetic, 1968
 Hydropsyche phalerata Hagen, 1861
 Hydropsyche philo Ross, 1941
 Hydropsyche pictetorum Botosaneanu & Schmid, 1973
 Hydropsyche placoda Ross, 1941
 Hydropsyche plana Forsslund, 1936
 Hydropsyche plesia Navás, 1934
 Hydropsyche pluvialis Navás, 1932
 Hydropsyche polyacantha Li & Tian, 1989
 Hydropsyche potomacensis Flint, 1965
 Hydropsyche poushyamittra Schmid, 1961
 Hydropsyche propinqua Ulmer, 1907
 Hydropsyche punica Malicky, 1981
 Hydropsyche rakshakaha Olah, 1994
 Hydropsyche reciproca (Walker, 1852)
 Hydropsyche renschi Mey, 1999
 Hydropsyche resmineda Malicky, 1977
 Hydropsyche ressli Malicky, 1974
 Hydropsyche rhomboana Martynov, 1909
 Hydropsyche rizali Banks, 1937
 Hydropsyche rossi Flint, Voshell & Parker, 1979
 Hydropsyche rotosa Ross, 1947
 Hydropsyche sagittata Martynov, 1936
 Hydropsyche sakarawaka Schmid, 1959
 Hydropsyche salki Mey, 1998
 Hydropsyche sappho Malicky, 1976
 Hydropsyche saranganica Ulmer, 1951
 Hydropsyche sattlerorum Tobias, 1972
 Hydropsyche saxonica McLachlan, 1884
 Hydropsyche scalaris Hagen, 1861
 Hydropsyche sciligra Malicky, 1977
 Hydropsyche scudderi Cockerell, 1909
 Hydropsyche selysi Ulmer, 1907
 Hydropsyche seramensis Mey, 1998
 Hydropsyche sikkimensis Mey, 1996
 Hydropsyche siltalai Doehler, 1963
 Hydropsyche simulans Ross, 1938
 Hydropsyche simulata Mosely, 1942
 Hydropsyche sinuata Botosaneanu & Marinkovic-Gospodnetic, 1968
 Hydropsyche sirimauna Mey, 1998
 Hydropsyche slossonae (Walker, 1852)
 Hydropsyche smiljae Marinkovic-Gospodnetic, 1979
 Hydropsyche sparna (Ross, 1938)
 Hydropsyche speciophila Mey, 1981
 Hydropsyche spiritoi Moretti, 1991
 Hydropsyche staphylostirpis Mey, 1998
 Hydropsyche striolata Navás, 1934
 Hydropsyche sulana Mey, 1998
 Hydropsyche supersonica Malicky, 1981
 Hydropsyche suppleta Mey, 1998
 Hydropsyche tabacarui Botosaneanu, 1960
 Hydropsyche tabulifera Schmid, 1963
 Hydropsyche taiwanensis Mey, 1998
 Hydropsyche talautensis Mey, 1999
 Hydropsyche tapena Kimmins, 1957
 Hydropsyche tenuis Navás, 1932
 Hydropsyche teruela Malicky, 1980
 Hydropsyche theodoriana Botosaneanu, 1974
 Hydropsyche tibetana Schmid, 1965
 Hydropsyche tibilais McLachlan, 1884
 Hydropsyche tigrata Malicky, 1974
 Hydropsyche tismanae Murgoci, 1968
 Hydropsyche tobiasi Malicky, 1977
 Hydropsyche trimonticola Mey, 1996
 Hydropsyche ulmeri Barnard, 1934
 Hydropsyche urgorrii Gonzalez & Malicky, 1980
 Hydropsyche valanis Ross, 1938
 Hydropsyche valkanovi Kumanski, 1974
 Hydropsyche venularis Banks, 1914
 Hydropsyche vespertina Flint, 1967
 Hydropsyche volitans Navas, 1924
 Hydropsyche vulpina Navás, 1934
 Hydropsyche walkeri (Betten & Mosely, 1940)
 Hydropsyche waltoni Martynov, 1930
 Hydropsyche wamba Mosely, 1939
 Hydropsyche winema Denning, 1965
 Hydropsyche wittei Marlier, 1943

References